Sacred Heart Catholic High School is a public Catholic high school in Newmarket, Ontario, Canada. It is currently the only high school in Newmarket under the jurisdiction of the York Catholic District School Board. There were 1620 full-time registered students for the 2005/2006 year, 95 full-time staff members, and 24 support staff.

History
In January 1969, the York Region Separate School Board came into existence with the combining of eleven small school boards. Shortly thereafter, the Board passed a motion to Catholic High Schools in Toronto. At their next meeting, trustees faced a parents' delegation protesting the decision. This delegation, in convincing the Board to reverse its stand, showed that support for the concept of Catholic education beyond elementary school was strong.

Thus, the Board carried on the tradition of Catholic education and continued to transport students to Catholic high schools in Metropolitan Toronto. In 1973, the Metro Separate School Board declared that these students could no longer be accommodated. Therefore, in 1974, the York Separate School Board decided to establish St. Robert Catholic High School in Thornhill, Ontario. In doing so, the Board made a statement that a second junior high school would be built north of Toronto at a future date "if the extension of Catholic education is supported by the Catholic community of York Region".

St. Robert was a tremendous success and after four years was filled to capacity. The Board, therefore, opened the doors of Sacred Heart Junior High School in September 1979, providing 265 students with a Grades 7 to 9 program. Through the cooperative efforts of the Board and the Toronto Archdiocese High School Commission, Grade 11 was introduced in September 1981 and one grade was added each subsequent year.

Simultaneously, a building program was undertaken and updated new facilities were made available to students in September 1983. The student population continued to increase and a new addition to the building was opened in May 1987.

The Catholic School Council in conjunction with staff and students continue to seek improvements to the school. In 2002 two new additions were added which gave the school a new cafeteria, upgraded physical education equipment and facilities, an expanded library resource centre, a theatre/lecture hall, new administrative offices as well as guidance and special education additions.

Another major renovation took place in the summer of 2004. The entire second floor of the old wing received new Science Labs and Art Rooms.

Sports and athletics
Sacred Heart Catholic High School's sports teams are known as the Crusaders. The school's mascot is Corky, a stylized knight who is known for his playful and sometimes silly attitude while attending Crusader home games.

Sacred Heart competes in a variety of different sports including:
Boys'/Girls' Basketball
Boys'/Girls' Soccer
Boys'/Girls' Hockey
Boys'/Girls' Volleyball
Boys'/Girls' Rugby
Cross country running
Track and field
Tennis
Ultimate
Swimming
Golf
Curling
Softball
Badminton
Baseball

The 2020 Athletic award Winners were announced in May, some of the Junior winners are:

Nolan Verboomen - Junior Boys Golf MVP Presented by: M. Woodrow, M. West and S. Zeagmen

Jeremy Riding - Junior Boys Basketball MVP Presented by: J. Scott

Grace Jean - Girls Basketball MVP Presented by: R. Imgrund

Dylan Campos - Junior Boys soccer MVP Presented by D. Quattitrochi and L. Vos

William Forhan - Junior Boys AOTY        Presented by J. Scott

Katie Newman - Junior Girls AOTY         Presented by R. Imgrund

School involvement
Sacred Heart has always been an active contributor to the local community. Every year, the school gets involved with many fundraising and charitable organizations.

Throughout the past few years, Sacred Heart has participated biannually in the Canadian Cancer Society's biggest fundraiser, Relay For Life. The school has been very successful each time they have participated and are among the top schools in the country. Since 2009, they have raised over $550,000 for cancer research. In the spring of 2012, Sacred Heart's students' raised over $150,000, the highest amount ever raised by any high school in Canada. The graduating class were featured on a CTV News broadcast. They raised $143,000 in 2014. Led by Aaron Zhang in 2016, the students raised over $186,000, setting both a personal and Canada-wide record yet again.

Clubs and activities

Some of Sacred Heart's many clubs, groups, teams, and councils include:

Anime Club
Arts Council
Athletic Council
Best Buddies
Choir
Coding Club
Concert Band
Dance Club
DECA
Environmental Council
Equity/Anti-Black Racism
ESL Ambassador's Club
Games Club
Jazz Band
Model UN at Sacred
Multicultural Cooking and Culture Club
Music Council
Presidents' Council
REACH For The Top
SAGA (Sexuality and Gender Acceptance) Club
SMASH (Student Mentors at Sacred Heart)
Sacred Beat (Newspaper Club)
Sacred Minds (Mental Health Council)
Sacred Reads
Sacred Rock Pile/Jamnation
Sacred Tech Team
Spirit Council
String Ensemble
Student Council
Ted-Ed Student Club

Famous alumni
 John Bartlett - sportscaster, hockey play-by-play announcer.
 Steve Downie - Pittsburgh Penguins player and member of the gold-winning 2006 and 2007 Canadian World Junior hockey teams.
 Michelle Lovretta - Gemini nominated screenwriter (Hunt for Justice) and an executive producer of Instant Star.
 Sheila Reid - Distance runner. Represented Canada at the 2012 Summer Olympics in London.
 Zoie Palmer - actress, known for playing Dr Lauren Lewis on Lost Girl.

References

Sources
Sacred Heart's official history

External links
Sacred Heart Catholic High School Homepage

York Catholic District School Board
High schools in the Regional Municipality of York
Catholic secondary schools in Ontario
Education in Newmarket, Ontario
Educational institutions established in 1979
1979 establishments in Ontario
Art schools in Canada